Aranyaprathet is a district (amphoe) in Sa Kaeo province in Thailand. It borders Cambodia to the east.

History
Aranyaprathet was originally a district in the Kabin Buri Province. On 1 April 1926 the province was abolished and the two districts Mueang Kabin Buri and Aranyapathet became districts of Prachinburi province. In 1993 it was one of the districts that formed the new Sa Kaeo province.

Economy
Until the Khmer Rouge disrupted neighbouring Cambodia in 1975, Aranyaprathet was a stop on the railroad connecting Bangkok with the Cambodian capital Phnom Penh. Aranyaprathet maintains its rail link with Bangkok but Poipet, the neighbouring Cambodian town, has still yet to see any rail activity since the Khmer Rouge destroyed the track.

Southeast of central Aranyaprathet, six kilometres distant, is the busiest border crossing between Cambodia and Thailand. In addition to being on a major trade route, the border sees much tourist activity as it is on the road between Bangkok and Siem Reap, the town nearest Angkor Wat.

Aran, as the town is known in Thailand, has been affected by the growth of the gambling industry in Poipet. Despite gambling being illegal in both Thailand and Cambodia, the Cambodian government has granted concessions for casinos to be built at many of its land crossings. Cambodians are not permitted to gamble in the casinos. Poipet's proximity to Bangkok (3-5 hrs by road) has made it the most popular of these border casino areas. It now hosts seven casinos.

Administration 
Aranyaprathet is divided into 13 sub-districts (tambons), which are further subdivided into 114 administrative villages (mubans).

Stadium

Aranyaprathet District Stadium is a multi-purpose stadium used mostly for football matches and was  the home stadium of Sa Kaeo F.C.

References

Aranyaprathet
Cambodia–Thailand border crossings